This article provides information on candidates who stood for the 1975 Australian federal election. The election was held on 13 December 1975.

Seat changes
Two Senate seats each were created for the Australian Capital and Northern Territories.
The member for Higgins, John Gorton (Independent), contested the Senate in the ACT.

Retiring Members and Senators

Labor
 Jim Cope MP (Sydney, NSW)
 Fred Daly MP (Grayndler, NSW)
 Bill Fulton MP (Leichhardt, Qld)
 Tony Luchetti MP (Macquarie, NSW)
 Len Reynolds MP (Barton, NSW)
Senator George Poyser (Vic)
Senator Don Willesee (WA)

Liberal
 Nigel Drury MP (Ryan, Qld)
 Dudley Erwin MP (Ballaarat, Vic)
 David Fairbairn MP (Farrer, NSW)
 Jim Forbes MP (Barker, SA)
Senator Sir Kenneth Anderson (NSW)
Senator John Marriott (Tas)

National Country
 John England MP (Calare, NSW)
Senator Ellis Lawrie (Qld)

Independent
Senator Cleaver Bunton (NSW)

House of Representatives
Sitting members at the time of the election are shown in bold text. Successful candidates are highlighted in the relevant colour. Where there is possible confusion, an asterisk (*) is also used.

Australian Capital Territory

New South Wales

Northern Territory

Queensland

South Australia

Tasmania

Victoria

Western Australia

Senate
Sitting Senators are shown in bold text. Since this was a double dissolution election, all senators were up for re-election. The first five successful candidates from each state were elected to six-year terms, the remaining five to three-year terms. Tickets that elected at least one Senator are highlighted in the relevant colour. Successful candidates are identified by an asterisk (*).

Australian Capital Territory
Two seats were up for election, the first time the ACT had voted for the Senate.

New South Wales
Ten seats were up for election. The Labor Party was defending five seats (although Lionel Murphy's vacancy had been filled by independent Cleaver Bunton, who did not contest in 1975). The Liberal-NCP Coalition was defending five seats.

Northern Territory
Two seats were up for election, the first time the Northern Territory had voted for the Senate.

Queensland
Ten seats were up for election. The Labor Party was defending three seats. The Liberal-NCP Coalition was defending six seats. Independent Senator Albert Field, who had been appointed to Labor Senator Bertie Milliner's seat after the latter's death, was defending one seat.

South Australia
Ten seats were up for election. The Labor Party was defending five seats. The Liberal Party was defending four seats. The Liberal Movement was defending one seat.

Tasmania
Ten seats were up for election. The Labor Party was defending five seats. The Liberal Party was defending four seats, but independent Senator Michael Townley had also joined the party.

Victoria
Ten seats were up for election. The Labor Party was defending five seats. The Liberal-NCP Coalition was defending five seats.

Western Australia
Ten seats were up for election. The Labor Party was defending five seats. The Liberal Party was defending four seats. The National Country Party was defending one seat.

Summary by party 

Beside each party is the number of seats contested by that party in the House of Representatives for each state, as well as an indication of whether the party contested the Senate election in the respective state.

See also
 1975 Australian federal election
 Members of the Australian House of Representatives, 1974–1975
 Members of the Australian House of Representatives, 1975–1977
 Members of the Australian Senate, 1974–1975
 Members of the Australian Senate, 1975–1978
 List of political parties in Australia

References
Adam Carr's Election Archive - House of Representatives 1975
Adam Carr's Election Archive - Senate 1975

1975 in Australia
Candidates for Australian federal elections